Samsung Developer Conference, also known as SDC, is an annual technology conference held by Samsung Electronics since 2013. The event focus in showcasing the latest technology advances in mobile software and Samsung solutions, such as SmartThings, Bixby, Tizen and One UI. From 2018, it has also unveiled the Infinity Flex display technology for foldable smartphones such as Samsung Galaxy Z Fold. The latest event, SDC 2021, was held online due to the COVID-19 pandemic.

Overview 
SDC started in 2013 as a technology event for people in the industry to “engage with industry leaders, collaborate with fellow developers, and learn about new Samsung tools and SDKs”, according to Samsung. The event usually takes place between October and November every year.

The first event was held in a hotel in San Francisco, but in the second edition they translated the venue to the McEnery Convention Center in San José.

During the first editions, SDC focused on mobile technologies, but in recent years it has also included sessions about Artificial Intelligence and Internet of Things.

History 
The first SDC edition was held from October 27 to 29 of 2013 in Westin ST. Francis Hotel in San Francisco, where the company discussed about Samsung Mobile SDK, Smart TV features and multi-screen. The following year, the venue changed to the Moscone West Convention Center in San Francisco, and mainly focused on Wearable devices and Virtual Reality.

After a year of hiatus in 2015, SDC 2016 came back with sessions centering mainly on Virtual Reality, which has been a big push for Injong Rhee (former Vice president and head of R&D in Samsung) and Samsung Developers.

Even though Samsung has struggled to generate enthusiasm for many of its software products, SDC 2017 attracted 5,000 people to the event, which focused in Bixby, SmartThings and AR. The fifth edition, held in 2018, was a turning point for SDC, since Samsung unveiled the prototype of its first foldable smartphone, the Infinity Flex Display.

SDC 2019 changed locations from San Francisco to San Jose Convention Center in California. With 5,000 participants, the conference discussed topics such as Blockchain, One UI, Bixby, SmartThings and Foldable UX Guide.

SDC 2020 was cancelled due to COVID-19 pandemic and the 2021 edition was the first to be held entirely online.

SDC22 conference will take place in Oct. 12 at the Moscone North in San Francisco, bringing the event back to a physical venue, and it is expected to share innovations in its software, services and platforms, especially in SmartThings.

See also 

 WWDC
 Google I/O
 Microsoft Build

References 

Samsung
Technology conferences